Ozark Township is an inactive township in Oregon County, in the U.S. state of Missouri.

Ozark Township took its name from the Ozark Land and Lumber Company.

References

Townships in Missouri
Townships in Oregon County, Missouri